Events from the year 1325 in the Kingdom of Scotland.

Incumbents
Monarch – Robert I

Events
 22 June – King Robert issues a commission to enquire into and report on the rights that had been granted by his predecessors to the citizens of Dundee after they had appealed to him to re-establish those rights.

See also

 Timeline of Scottish history

References

 
Years of the 14th century in Scotland
Wars of Scottish Independence